Mārtiņš Rocēns (born 9 April 2000) is a Latvian tennis player.

Rocēns has a career high ATP singles ranking of 1482 achieved on 8 August 2022. He also has a career high ATP doubles ranking of 1367 achieved on 15 August 2022.

Rocēns represents Latvia at the Davis Cup, where he has a W/L record of 2–1. He also plays college tennis at NC State University.

References

External links

2000 births
Living people
Latvian male tennis players
Sportspeople from Riga
NC State Wolfpack men's tennis players
21st-century Latvian people